Environmental Science: Processes & Impacts is a monthly peer-reviewed scientific journal covering all aspects of environmental science. It is published by the Royal Society of Chemistry and Kris McNeill is the editor-in-chief. The journal was established in 1999 as the Journal of Environmental Monitoring and obtained its current title in 2013.

Article types 
The journal publishes full research papers, communications, perspectives, critical reviews, frontier reviews, tutorial reviews, comments, and highlights.

Abstracting and indexing 
According to the Journal Citation Reports, the journal has a 2020 impact factor of 4.238.

The journal is abstracted and indexed in: 
 
 Analytical Abstracts
 Chemical Abstracts Service
 Embase/Excerpta Medica
 Elsevier BIOBASE
 Current Awareness in Biological Sciences
 Index Medicus/MEDLINE/PubMed
 CAB International
 VINITI Database RAS
 Science Citation Index
 Current Contents/Agriculture
 Biology & Environmental Sciences
 Current Contents/Physical
 Chemical & Earth Sciences
 The Zoological Record
 BIOSIS Previews

Sister journals 
The Royal Society of Chemistry publishes 2 other journals in the Environmental Science portfolio: Environmental Science: Nano was established in 2014 and Environmental Science: Water Research & Technology in 2015.

See also 
 List of chemistry journals

References

External links 
 

Environmental science journals
Royal Society of Chemistry academic journals
Human impact on the environment
Monthly journals
Publications established in 1999
English-language journals